The  Medical Corps (Heil HaRfu'a) is an Israel Defense Forces corps responsible for providing healthcare services and medical treatment and instruction to all levels of the IDF.

History
During wars or emergencies, the Medical Corps also assumes authority over the civilian healthcare system in Israel. The corps attends to the planning, organization, and supervision over the preparedness of the healthcare system to face crises. As of 2014, the corps is headed by Brigadier General Dr. Dudu Dagan. Its headquarters are located in Tel HaShomer.

Structure

The Medical Corps is divided into six brigade- or battalion-level units:
Medical Organization Division
Medical Division
Bahad 10 – The training base and Military Medicine Academy 
Mental Health Division
Dental Health Division
Medical Services Center, headed by a colonel, is the corps's main operational unit, consisting of four regional medical service centers.

Commanders

See also
Magen David Adom

External links
Official site

Corps of Israel
Military medicine in Israel
Military medical organizations
Military units and formations established in 1948